Kounu is a goddess in Meitei mythology and religion of ancient Kangleipak (ancient Manipur). She is a consort of the god Koupalu. She is the guardian of the northern direction. Kounu has two homes. Her main home is on Mount Kounu. Her other home is in Mount Koubru, which is where her husband Koupalu (Koubru) lives. She is worshipped with Koubru as the deities of the Khullakpa (village chief). Kounu and Koubru ruled ancient Manipur for a very long time after the reign of King Ningthou Puthiba.

She dwells in the snows of the far north and she is also known as Kongthem.

Description 
Kounu is one of the deities who change climate and weather. Her husband Koupalu and her son Loyalakpa are also weather deities. Meitei people believe that if the annual rainfall is good, then it is caused by goddess Kounu. When goddess Kounu changes the climate, there will be hardly any flood. Crop yields are good in Kounu's activities.

Mythology

Love and marriage proposal 
Kounu met Koupalu for the first time when she was searching for cotton plants in the western slopes of Mount Koubru. The two fell in love at first sight. Kounu asked Koupalu to bring her all kinds of fruit for the marriage proposal. She said she would not agree to marry him if he failed to do so. So, on a Saturday, Koupalu had a meeting with all the gods and goddesses of hills and plains. They all prepared for fruits of all sorts. They planned to proceed to the marriage proposal on the next day, Sunday.

On the next day's before sunrise, goddesses brought the fruits to Kounu's place. Male gods also came with Koupalu to the place. The gods found two fruits missing, heikru (Indian gooseberry, Phyllanthus emblica) and Heining. Then, Kounu rejected the marriage proposal. At this, Koupalu told her that she would have a daughter because she had gotten pregnant the last time they had met. Then the other male gods got angry because of Kounu's excessively reserved marriage proposal conditions while she was already conceived. They put a curse on Kounu's baby, saying she would be born on a stone slab on the baby's next incarnation. The goddesses were about to curse the baby to be turned into flower during birth, but they didn't as Kounu had been punished enough. Feeling embarrassed, Kounu also cursed that all the gifts to be turned into stones on the very sunrise. Soon, as the sun rose up, all the gifts turned into stones.

Birth of Leisna - Cursed baby's very birth 
Kounu gave birth to a daughter named "Leisna" (Laisna, Leisana, Laisana). When her daughter grew up, she asked Kounu about her father and Kounu told her. Leisna asked to go to her father's place to meet him. Kounu let her go. On her way, Leisna met Pakhangba. They became lovers. Later, they married. Since Leisna was a mortal, she died when her time of death came.

Adoption of Thoudu Nungthel Leima - Cursed baby's next incarnation 
Kounu and Koupalu lived together. Once Leimarel Sidabi decided to incarnate herself as the daughter of the two. So, Leimarel incarnated herself into a baby infant girl. On the very day, Kounu and Koupalu were walking on a hilly region. Koubru got very thirsty. He found Kounu's pitcher empty. Unable to bear his thirst, he went down the riverside to drink water. Surprisingly, he found a newly born girl lying on a stone slab of the river bed. Koupalu shouted three times if there was anyone for the baby girl. No one responded. So, Koupalu and Kounu brought the girl to their abode. The two adopted the girl as their own daughter. They gave her three names. The baby was named "Ipok Leima" ("Eepok Leima") because she was found in the stream. The baby was also named Thoudu Nungthel Leima because she was found lying on the stone slab. The baby was given her final name as "Taipang Nganpi" ("Taibang Nganbi") because she was beautiful as well as bright.

Kounu and Loyalakpa 
Once Kounu was asked by her son Loyalakpa about the true origin of Thoudu Nungthel Leima. Loyalakpa was suspicious if Thoudu Nungthel Leima was really his real sister or not. Koupalu had already warned Kounu not to reveal the secret of Thoudu Nungthel Leima to their son. So, at first, Kounu lied to him. But at Loyalakpa's grudge, she decided to tell him the truth. But since both Kounu and Loyalakpa were at Koupalu's abode, she dared not to speak anything about it. She feared Koupalu might heard of it. With permission from Koupalu, Kounu, and her son Loyalakpa went to her abode. It was the safe place to reveal the truth. Kounu narrated Loyalakpa how she and Koupalu found Thoudu Nungthel Leima lying on a stone slab in the river. She revealed that Thoudu Nungthel Leima was actually their adopted daughter and not real by birth. 
Later, Kounu's son Loyalakpa and Kounu's adopted daughter Thoudu Nungthel Leima married.

Cults and shrines 
Kounu and her husband Koupalu are worshipped in many cults and shrines of Manipur. Some are located in Mayang Langjing, Awang Khunnou, Senjam, Chirang, Loitang Khunnou, Tingri, Koutruk, Awang Potsangbam, Sairem Khul, Kameng, Sarouthel, Lairel Sajik, Lairel Kaabi, Heibongpokpi, Nongchup Sanjenbam, Tauthong, Haorang Keithel, Haorang Saabal, Kwak Siphai, Narelkonjin, Thamnapokpi, Awang Sekmai, Leimram, Phumlou Keiroi, Phumlou Siphai, Potsangbam Thouriphi, Samushang, Keinou Thongthak, Khonghampat, Akham, Morok Ingkhol, Lambaal Khul, Phayeng, Haujongban, Awang Keingam, Khurkhul and Leikinthabi. According to Meitei culture, Kounu and Koupalu are the protectors of said places.

In the village of Senjan Chirang in Manipur, there is a pantheon of the goddess as "Ebendhou Kounu Lairembi Lai Haraofam".

References 

Abundance deities
Abundance goddesses
Agricultural deities
Agricultural goddesses
Arts deities
Arts goddesses
Asian deities
Asian goddesses
Beauty deities
Beauty goddesses
Crafts deities
Crafts goddesses
Creator deities
Creator goddesses
Fertility deities
Fertility goddesses
Fortune deities
Fortune goddesses
Guardians of the directions
Harvest deities
Harvest goddesses
Health deities
Health goddesses
Justice deities
Justice goddesses
Knowledge deities
Knowledge goddesses
Leima
Love and lust deities
Love and lust goddesses
Magic deities
Magic goddesses
Maintenance deities
Maintenance goddesses
Marriage deities
Marriage goddesses
Meitei deities
Mountain deities
Mountain goddesses
Names of God in Sanamahism
Nature deities
Nature goddesses
Peace deities
Peace goddesses
Rain deities
Savior deities
Savior goddesses
Sky and weather deities
Sky and weather goddesses
Time and fate deities
Time and fate goddesses
Trickster deities
Trickster goddesses
Tutelary deities
Tutelary goddesses
Wind deities
Wind goddesses
Wisdom deities
Wisdom goddesses